The Jewish Question  is an 1843 book by German historian and theologian Bruno Bauer, written and published in German (original title ).

Bauer argued that Jews can achieve political emancipation only if they relinquish their particular religious consciousness, since political emancipation requires a secular state, which he assumes does not leave any "space" for social identities such as religion. According to Bauer, such religious demands are incompatible with the idea of the "Rights of Man." True political emancipation, for Bauer, requires the abolition of religion. He described the contemporary concept of Jewish nationalism as "chimerical" and "baseless".

See also 
 Jewish Question

References

External links 
 
 Bruno Bauer, Jewish Encyclopedia (1901–1906)

1843 non-fiction books
1843 essays
Books critical of Judaism
German essays